Patricia Anne Elsener (October 22, 1929 – September 29, 2019) was an American diver. She won the AAU indoor 3 m springboard title in 1946 and 1947. At the 1948 Summer Olympics she collected a silver medal in the 10-meter platform and a bronze in springboard.

See also
 List of members of the International Swimming Hall of Fame

References

1929 births
2019 deaths
American female divers
Divers at the 1948 Summer Olympics
Olympic silver medalists for the United States in diving
Olympic bronze medalists for the United States in diving
Medalists at the 1948 Summer Olympics
21st-century American women